The Limoniinae are a paraphyletic assemblage of genera within the crane flies, Tipulidae, although they can usually be distinguished by the way the wings are held at rest. Limoniines usually hold/fold the wings along the back of the body, whereas other tipulids usually hold them out at right angles. Snow flies (genus: Chionea) such as Chionea scita have no wings at all. Limoniines are also usually smaller than other tipulids, with some exceptions. 

Limoniinae are a very large assemblage with nearly 10,500 described species in 133 genera, and were historically treated as a subfamily, but their classification is in flux; numerous authors recently treated the group at the rank of family, but subsequent phylogenetic analyses revealed that the remaining groups of tipulids render the group paraphyletic. 

These flies are found in damp places throughout the world, and many species form dense swarms in suitable habitats.

Description

For terms see Morphology of Diptera

Limoniines are medium or small-sized, rarely large. The proboscis or rostrum lacks a beak. The apical segment of the maxillary palpi is short and never longer than subapical one. The antennae are, in most species, 14- or 16-segmented (rarely 6-, 10-, or 17-segmented), usually verticillate (whorls of trichia) and only exceptionally ctenidial or serrate (Rhipidia). There is a distinct V-shaped suture between the mesonotal prescutum and scutum (near the level of the wing bases). The wings are monochromatic or punctate and (in females more often than in males). sometimes shortened or reduced. The subcosta always fuses with the costa through Sc1. Radial vein R2 does not fuse with the costa, as in most other Tipulidae, but with radial vein R3. The radial sector Rs has one or two forks. Additional crossveins are sometimes present in cells r3 an1 and m. Cells m1 and d are often not present. The genitalia of males have large separated gonocoxis and one or two pairs of appendages which are sometimes greatly folded (Dicranomyia, etc.). The ovipositor of the female has sclerotized cerci.

Biology
Mostly, larvae are aquatic or semi-aquatic. In comparison, most other Tipulidae larvae are terrestrial, though some are aquatic and found in huge numbers in lotic habitats like the limoniine larvae. Various species have evolved to feed on different food sources, so phytophagous, saprophagous, mycetophagous and predatory species occur.

Limoniines occupy a wide range of habitats and micro habitats: in earth rich in humus, in swamps and marshes, in leaf litter and in wet spots in woods (numerous genera and species); in soils with only moderate humus content along stream borders (Gonomyia Meigen, Rhabdomastix Skuse, Arctoconopa Alexander, Hesperoconopa Alexander); in dry to saturated decaying wood in streams, where the larvae feed on fungal mycelia (Gnophomyia Osten Sacken, Teucholabis Osten Sacken, Lipsothrix Loew); in decaying plant materials (various subgenera and species of Limonia), in woody and fleshy fungi (Limonia (Metalimnobia Matsumura); in fresh water, especially rapidly flowing streams (Antocha Osten Sacken, Hesperoconopa Alexander, Cryptolabis Osten Sacken); intertidal zones and brackish water (Limonia (Idioglochina Alexander, Limonia (Diuanomyia) Stephens); freshwater aquatic environment during the larval stage and nearby margin areas for pupation (Limonia Meigen, Thaumastoptera Mik, many Pediciini, Hexatomini, and Eriopterini); steep cliff faces supporting a constantly wet film of algae (some species of Limonia Meigen, Orimarga Osten Sacken Elliptera Schiner); in moist to wet cushions of mosses or liverworts growing on rocks or earth (various species).

Phantolabis lacustris was the first tipulid species to be observed skating on the surface of water. It possesses morphological adaptations to allow for this phenomenon.

Species lists
West Palaearctic including Russia
Australasian/Oceanian
Nearctic
Japan

Evolution
Limoniines are not particularly common in amber deposits, but a few finds (e.g. Tipunia intermedia Krzeminski & Ansorge, 1995 from the Upper Jurassic Solnhofen limestones) suggest the group has been extant since the Jurassic period. Another specimen (Limonia dillonae) preserved in amber in the Raritan-Magothy Formation suggests limoniines have been extant since the Upper Cretaceous period.

Gallery

See also
 List of limoniid genera

References

 Description, ranked as family
 
 Fossil Diptera catalog
 Diptera.info Images
 Limoniidae at EOL images
 Photographic guide to species traditionally grouped as Limoniines.

Tipulidae
Nematocera subfamilies